Germán Santa María Barragán (born 24 January 1950) is the current Ambassador of Colombia to Portugal. A renowned journalist in Colombia, he is a five-time winner of the Simón Bolívar National Award in Journalism, and twice served as president of the Bogotá Circle of Journalists; he has been a contributor for El Tiempo for eleven years, and editor-in-chief of Diners magazine since 1999. As a writer, his novel No Morirás won the Julio Cortázar Ibero-American Short Story Award, and was turned into a made-for-television film by director Jorge Alí Triana and aired in 1997.

Ambassadorship

Santa María was appointed Ambassador Extraordinary and Plenipotentiary of Colombia to Portugal on 2 March 2011 by President Juan Manuel Santos Calderón at a ceremony at the Palace of Nariño. Santa María presented his Letters of Credence to the President of Portugal, Aníbal Cavaco Silva, on 31 May 2011 during a ceremony at the Belém Palace. As Ambassador to Portugal, Santa María is also accredited as Non-Resident Ambassador of Colombia to the African nations of Burkina Faso, Cape Verde, Côte d'Ivoire, Equatorial Guinea, the Gambia, Guinea, Guinea-Bissau, Mali, Mauritania, São Tomé and Príncipe, Senegal, Sierra Leone, and Togo.

Selected works

See also
 Orlando Sardi de Lima

References

1950 births
Living people
People from Líbano, Tolima
Colombian journalists
Male journalists
Ambassadors of Colombia to Portugal
Colombian male novelists
20th-century Colombian novelists
Ambassadors of Colombia to Burkina Faso
Ambassadors of Colombia to Cape Verde
Ambassadors of Colombia to Ivory Coast
Ambassadors of Colombia to Equatorial Guinea
Ambassadors of Colombia to the Gambia
Ambassadors of Colombia to Guinea
Ambassadors of Colombia to Guinea-Bissau
Ambassadors of Colombia to Mali
Ambassadors of Colombia to Mauritania
Ambassadors of Colombia to São Tomé and Príncipe
Ambassadors of Colombia to Senegal
Ambassadors of Colombia to Sierra Leone
Ambassadors of Colombia to Togo
Colombian diplomats
20th-century male writers